The Laval Comets was a Canadian women's soccer team established in 2006 in the city of Laval, Quebec, Canada, a northern suburb of Montreal. The team was a member of the W-League, the second tier of women’s soccer in the United States and Canada.

The team played its home games at the Centre Sportif Bois-de-Boulogne. The club's colours were light blue and dark blue.

History
The Laval Comets is founded in 2005 by Pierre Marchand ( a businessman of Laval), following the demise of Montreal Xtreme (2004) and Dynamites de Laval (1997-2001). Pierre Marchand joins to  3 partners (Montreal Impact, Centre Sportif Bois-de-Boulogne, and the  Fédération de soccer du Québec) who will allow to assure the team for period minimum of three years. The club set up as a non-profit organization owned by the 3 partners: This to assure the survival of the team for some years. In October 2005, the contacts are established with the W-League  and a new franchising is granted to the group for the city of Laval. In November, 2005, a competition is thrown to find a name to the new team. Already a craze for the new team is tangible because hundred of names are subjected. And so the management of the club opts for the name Comètes de Laval. In January 2006, the club confirms the first major sponsor joins the team (Grolsch beer).  The presentation of team's colors shirts and the first players under contract takes place on March 8, 2006.

Year-by-year

Players
The Laval Comets have a wide range of talent, some from university, high school and others that currently play or have played for the Canadian National Team ( 7 Laval Comets players in the 2010 CONCACAF Women’s Under-20 Championship ). The season is short since most players play in Canadian and American universities, therefore it is designed to accommodate their schedules and ends the first week of August.

Squad 2014

Coaching Staff 2014
    Head Coach: Cindy Walsh
    Assistant Coach: Chantal Daigle

Former head coach 
  Mohamed Hilen (2006-2008)
  Lyonel Joseph (2009-2012)

Former assistant coach 
  Owen Braun (2006, 2007, 2008, 2009, 2010)

Former assistant coach 
  Jimmy Patsilivas (2014 & 2015)

Rivalries

Laval Comets have a big rivalry with Quebec City Amiral SC.
Several former players of Comets play for the Amiral SC. In matches between the two teams, it is not uncommon for supporters to travel Montreal-Quebec city or Quebec city-Montreal to go to encourage her teams.

Supporters
At the gate, the Comets had always been solid with average crowds of 500 fans. After disappointing season in 2009  (where the average gate was between 800 and 900 people), the attendance to the matches falls to 266 persons by match in 2010.

The all-time single game high is the 952 fans in attendance against Ottawa Fury Women (Friday evening July 4, 2008).

External links
Officiel web site of Laval Comets/Comètes de Laval
Laval Comets on USL Soccer

References

Women's soccer clubs in Canada
Soccer clubs in Quebec
Sport in Laval, Quebec
Laval Comets
United Soccer League teams based in Canada
USL W-League (1995–2015) teams
2006 establishments in Quebec
2016 disestablishments in Quebec
Association football clubs established in 2006
Association football clubs disestablished in 2016